Tirlán (known as Glanbia Co-operative Society Limited from 1997 until 2022) is an Irish dairy co-operative. The co-operative has its roots in a series of amalgamations of small rural co-operative creamery societies throughout County Kilkenny, most notably the amalgamation of Avonmore Creameries Federation in 1966. 

Prior to the full takeover of Glanbia Ireland, the primary activities of the co-operative had been managing the co-operatives investments for the benefit of its farmer-members.

History

The Village Creameries amalgamation started when the Avonmore Creameries food brand  was first created in 1966, by founder Mr. Redmond Brennan. Their Co-op entity was registered as a public company in 1988, as Avonmore Food plc and later amalgamated with Waterford Food plc in 1997. It is today known as Glanbia, a nutrition company with wholly owned revenues of over €2.3 billion and 6,900 employees in 2018. Their ambition as set out in 2018, is to be a €6bn total revenue group in 2022.

The creamery became a success story that emerged from the dedication and cooperation among farmers, management, workers and the community at large. They were run by Committee. Each Creamery became a branch of Avonmore Foods plc. The Irish Co-operative Organisation Society (ICOS) played a central role in that success by unifying all the Creameries from their foundation in 1894 through advising management and committees on all aspects of Dairy Society. It was ICOS who brought farming people together in Kilkenny and surrounding counties. Despite that, many Creameries would not have survived but for far-seeing farmers who were willing to invest in the society. Some went into liquidation. Apart from milk collection, Creameries provided invaluable services to the farming communities -including butter making with on site shops but also grain drying and agricultural contract work.

In the 1960s, Avonmore sought to derive benefit from increased scale and greater diversification . Both Avonmore and Glanbia have their origins in the Irish agricultural co-operative movement that evolved over the last century, ever since first Irish Co-operative in 1889 was founded by Horace Plunkett. 

The following year, the co-operative entered into a joint venture with Unigate Limited to construct the largest dairy processing facility in Europe at that time at Ballyragget, and would become Ireland's largest milk producer by the 1970s. Following the 1997 amalgamation of Avonmore and Waterford Foods plc., the co-operative and associated plc. was rebranded as Glanbia.

The Avonmore name continues to be used in a wide variety of branded products such as milk, cheese, soup and butter, and is the most purchased grocery brand in Ireland.

Between 2001 and 2004 Glanbia implemented a significant reorganisation aimed at reshaping its portfolio and providing the foundation for future growth. In 2008 they decided to vertically integrate with the acquisition of a customer, Optimum Nutrition. Glanbia went on to become a leader in the branded sports nutrition sector both in the US and internationally. Glanbia Plc now have operations in 34 countries and are exporting from Ireland to more than 100 countries worldwide. Their combined operations were ranked by revenues (in 2010 figures) in the top 100 Cooperatives, at No 98 Co-op in the world and at No 1 Co-op in Ireland, by the International Co-operative Alliance (ICA), an international organisation of co-operatives. 

2012 was an important turning point in the history of Glanbia Plc as it sought to separation from its co-operative origins, Avonmore. On 29 August 2012, the company proposed to buy 60% of its Irish dairy processing business from Glanbia Ingredients Ireland, reducing its shareholding in Glanbia from 54% to 41%. Both shareholders and society members approved in November 2012, Glanbia Ingredients Ireland became a 40% associate of Glanbia. As of 2018, Glanbia Ireland, the unit spun off in 2017 from Glanbia PLC, today owns brands Avonmore and Kilmeaden, has launched a new consumer brand in the United States, Truly Grass Fed, focusing initially on the sale of cheese. Glanbia PLC owns about 40pc of Glanbia Ireland, with the original Glanbia Co-op owning the remainder of their subsidiary.

The Glanbia Collection
According to Glanbia Collections in Kilkenny Archives at St Kieran's College, Kilkenny, Avonmore Creameries Federation, the predecessor to Glanbia Co-operative Society Limited was created through the amalgamation of the following Village Creameries that are included among their archives for:

Ballingarry Co-Operative Creamery Ltd., Ballyhale Co-Operative Creamery Dairy Society Ltd.,Ballypatrick Co-Operative Creamery Ltd., Avonmore Creameries Ltd., Ballyragget Co-Operative Creamery Ltd., Bennettsbridge Co-Operative Creamery Ltd., Callan Co-op Creamery and Dairy Society Ltd., Castlehale Co-Operative Dairy Society Ltd., Castlecomer Co-Operative Creamery Ltd., Donaghmore Co-Operative Creamery Ltd., Dungarvan Co Waterford Co-Operative Creamery Ltd., Freshford Co-Operative Creamery Ltd., Glenmore, County Kilkenny Co-Operative Creamery Ltd., Graiguecullen, County Carlow Corn & Coal Co. Ltd., IDA Co-Operative Creamery Ltd., Kells, County Kilkenny, Co-Operative Agricultural & Dairy Society Ltd., Kilmanagh, County Kilkenny Co-Operative Creamery Ltd., Kilkenny City Co-Operative Creamery Ltd., Leinster Milk Producers Association Ltd., Loughcullen County Kilkenny Co-Operative Creamery Ltd., Miloko Co-Operative Society Ltd., Knockavendagh & Moylgass Killenaule Co-Operative Creamery Society Ltd., Muckalee County Kilkenny Co-Operative Dairy Society Ltd. Mullinavat Co-Operative Creamery Society Ltd., Piltown Co-Operative Society Ltd., Slieverue Co-Operative Creamery Ltd., Shelbourne Co-Operative Agriculture Society Ltd., Windgap Co-Operative Dairy Society Ltd., Letterkenny Timber Co. Ltd., The Bacon Company of Ireland, Inch Creamery (Awaiting to be catalogued), Barrowvale, Goresbridge Creamery (Awaiting to be catalogued).

1960-1983 – Formation of Avonmore and Waterford

Cooperatives of that time had major downsides in that they lacked significant capital raising instruments for expansion and development and also the legal and financial protection afforded by corporate structures. To realise the benefits of scale and diversification, the 1960s thus witnessed the amalgamation of many small, locally focused co-operative Creameries across Ireland. Accordingly, Waterford Co-op Society was formed in 1964, followed by Avonmore Creameries in Kilkenny two years later, in 1966. Increased farm collection and processing capacity were urgently required. That led to the super milk trucks and construction of a multi-purpose Avonmore dairy plant facility in Ballyragget, County Kilkenny, close to the Avon River from which Avonmore took its name. It was believed to be the biggest food processing facility in Europe at that time and probably the fourth largest in the world.

1984-1996 – Flotation and expansion

After the introduction of European milk quotas in 1984, the domestic growth opportunities for Irish co-operatives and their members were very limited. Waterford Co-op Society and Avonmore Creameries both realised that to expand they would have to seek out new markets from outside of Ireland. The best way to fund such an expansion they recognised was through a stock market flotation. Accordingly, Avonmore Foods plc was floated on the Irish Stock Exchange on 6 September 1988 and Waterford Foods plc were floated a month later on 6 October 1988. This provided the funding to expand their product offerings while also expanding their geographic footprint. They acquired a number of small cheese plants in the US to form a platform for their market-leading US Cheese business that they retain today.

1997-2000 – The amalgamation

After their flotations in 1988, Avonmore Foods and Waterford Foods pursued similar growth strategies. It made commercial sense for both amalgamate. On 4 September 1997 Avonmore Foods plc and Waterford Foods plc merge to form Avonmore Waterford Group (AWG) plc. After agreement was reached in a special general meeting in Waterford attended by almost 3,200 of the Waterford Co-op's 5,000 shareholders, a joint statement of the Chairmen read: "It would lead to an Irish, farmer-controlled food company with the scale and resources to successfully compete in a highly competitive international marketplace".It was then the fourth biggest dairy processor in Europe and the fourth biggest cheese producer in the world. In 1999, the business was rebranded Glanbia plc.

Glanbia Ireland Takeover
In 2021, the members of the co-operative approved the takeover of Glanbia Ireland along with its dairy processing business. The sale completed in April 2022 which marks the return of direct ownership of the dairy processing business to its farmer-members.  Subsequently both the co-coperative and Glanbia Ireland rebranded as Tirlán to differentiate themselves from Glanbia PLC.

References

Cooperatives in Ireland
Cooperatives in the Republic of Ireland
Dairy products companies of Ireland
Dairy cooperatives
Food and drink companies of Ireland
Irish brands